Drosophila tenebrosa is a species of mushroom-feeding fruit fly in the Drosophila quinaria species group.

References

External links

 

tenebrosa
Articles created by Qbugbot
Insects described in 1866